This is a list of 306 species in Bezzia, a genus of biting midges in the family Ceratopogonidae.

Bezzia species

 Bezzia acanthodes Macfie, 1940 c g
 Bezzia acuta Remm, 1974 c g
 Bezzia adamsi Tokunaga & Murachi, 1959 c g
 Bezzia aegytia Kieffer, 1924 c g
 Bezzia affinis (Staeger, 1839) c g
 Bezzia africana Ingram & Macfie, 1923 c g
 Bezzia aitkeni Spinelli, 1991 c g
 Bezzia aklavikensis Wirth and Grogan, 1983 i c g
 Bezzia albicornis (Meigen, 1818) c g
 Bezzia albidorsata Malloch, 1915 i c g
 Bezzia albipes (Winnertz, 1852) c g
 Bezzia albuquerquei Lane, 1961 c g
 Bezzia aldanica Remm, 1974 c g
 Bezzia algeriana Clastrier, 1962 c g
 Bezzia amana Meillon & Wirth, 1981 c g
 Bezzia ammossovi Remm, 1974 c g
 Bezzia analis Kieffer, 1913 c g
 Bezzia andersonorum Wirth and Grogan, 1983 i c g
 Bezzia angulata Remm, 1974 c g
 Bezzia annulipes (Meigen, 1838) i c
 Bezzia apicata Malloch, 1914 i c g
 Bezzia araucana Spinelli & Wirth, 1990 c g
 Bezzia armatipes Kieffer, 1910 c g
 Bezzia assimilis Johannsen, 1931 c g
 Bezzia atacina Clastrier, 1962 c g
 Bezzia atrifemorata Clastrier, 1962 c g
 Bezzia atripluma Kieffer, 1919 c g
 Bezzia atrovittata Remm, 1972 c g
 Bezzia australiensis Kieffer, 1917 c g
 Bezzia badiifemorata Tokunaga & Murachi, 1959 c g
 Bezzia bargaensis Remm, 1974 c g
 Bezzia bengalensis Kieffer, 1913 c g
 Bezzia biannulata Wirth, 1952 i c g
 Bezzia bicolor (Meigen, 1904) i c g
 Bezzia bilineata Wirth, 1952 i c g
 Bezzia bivittata (Coquillett, 1905) i c g
 Bezzia blandiata Remm, 1967 c g
 Bezzia blantoni Spinelli & Wirth, 1989 c g
 Bezzia bohemica Kieffer, 1919 c g
 Bezzia boiemica Kieffer, 1922 c g
 Bezzia bresi Huttel & Huttel, 1951 c g
 Bezzia brevicornis (Kieffer, 1917) c g
 Bezzia brevipluma Kieffer, 1919 c g
 Bezzia bromeliae Spinelli, 1991 c g
 Bezzia calceata (Walker, 1856) c g
 Bezzia calcuttensis Kieffer, 1913 c g
 Bezzia campanai Clastrier, 1962 c g
 Bezzia capitata Wirth and Grogan, 1983 i c g
 Bezzia carioca (Lane, 1958) c
 Bezzia catarinensis Spinelli & Wirth, 1990 c g
 Bezzia cayoensis Spinelli, 1991 c g
 Bezzia chelistyla Wirth and Grogan, 1983 i c g
 Bezzia chilensis Spinelli & Ronderos, 2001 c g
 Bezzia chrysolopha Kieffer, 1912 c g
 Bezzia circumdata (Staeger, 1839) c g
 Bezzia clarkei Tokunaga & Murachi, 1959 c g
 Bezzia clavipennis Spinelli & Wirth, 1989 c g
 Bezzia cockerelli Malloch, 1915 i c g
 Bezzia collessi Wirth & Ratanaworabhan, 1981 c g
 Bezzia coloradensis Wirth, 1952 i
 Bezzia concoloripes Macfie, 1940 c g
 Bezzia congolensis (Vattier & Adam, 1966) c g
 Bezzia conjunctivena Tokunaga, 1966 c g
 Bezzia conspersa Johannsen, 1931 c g
 Bezzia corvina Remm, 1974 c g
 Bezzia curtiforceps Goetghebuer, 1929 c g
 Bezzia cyrtonotum Remm, 1974 c g
 Bezzia decincta Edwards, 1932 g
 Bezzia demeilloni (Haeselbarth, 1975) c g
 Bezzia dentata Malloch, 1914 i c g
 Bezzia dentifemur Spinelli, 1991 c g
 Bezzia dessarti Haeselbarth, 1980 c g
 Bezzia dewulfi (Goetghebuer, 1935) c
 Bezzia diagramma Kieffer, 1925 c g
 Bezzia digramma Kieffer, 1925 g
 Bezzia diversipes (Clastrier, 1958) c g
 Bezzia dividua Tokunaga, 1966 c g
 Bezzia dorsasetula Dow and Turner, 1976 i c g
 Bezzia downesi Dow and Turner, 1976 i c g
 Bezzia echinata Clastrier, 1985 c g
 Bezzia edwardsi (Meillon, 1938) c g
 Bezzia elongata Zilahi-Sebess, 1940 c g
 Bezzia eucera Kieffer, 1911 c g
 Bezzia excavata Tokunaga, 1966 c g
 Bezzia excisa Clastrier, 1962 c g
 Bezzia exclamationis Kieffer, 1918 c g
 Bezzia exigua Goetghebuer, 1935 c g
 Bezzia expedita Sinha, Mazumdar, Das Gupta & Chaudhuri, 2003 c g
 Bezzia expolita (Coquillett, 1901) i c g
 Bezzia facialis Kieffer, 1910 c g
 Bezzia fairchildi Wirth, 1983 i c g
 Bezzia fascispinosa Clastrier, 1962 i c g
 Bezzia fenestrata Clastrier, 1962 c g
 Bezzia filiductus Spinelli, 1991 c g
 Bezzia flava Tokunaga, 1939 c g
 Bezzia flavescens Kieffer, 1913 c g
 Bezzia flavicornis (Staeger, 1839) c g
 Bezzia flavicorporis (Meillon, 1939) c g
 Bezzia flavipennis Tokunaga, 1939 c g
 Bezzia flavitarsis Malloch, 1914 i c g
 Bezzia flavitibia Dow and Turner, 1976 i c g
 Bezzia flavoscutellaris (Haeselbarth, 1975) c g
 Bezzia flinti Spinelli, 1991 c g
 Bezzia fluminensis Lane, 1948 c g
 Bezzia fontanus Liu, Ge & Liu, 1996 c g
 Bezzia fortigenitalis Sinha, Mazumdar, Das Gupta & Chaudhuri, 2003 c g
 Bezzia foyi (Ingram & Macfie, 1921) c
 Bezzia fuliginata Clastrier, 1962 c g
 Bezzia fusca Spinelli, 1991 c g
 Bezzia fuscifemoris Remm, 1971 c g
 Bezzia gandavensis Goetghebuer, 1935 c g
 Bezzia gibbera (Coquillett, 1905) i c g
 Bezzia gibberella Wirth and Grogan, 1983 i c g
 Bezzia glabra (Coquillett, 1902) i c g
 Bezzia glaucivena Sinha, Mazumdar, Das Gupta & Chaudhuri, 2003 c g
 Bezzia globulosa Spinelli & Wirth, 1990 c g
 Bezzia goianensis Lane, 1961 c g
 Bezzia gracilipes (Winnertz, 1852) c g
 Bezzia gressitti Tokunaga, 1966 c g
 Bezzia griseata Remm, 1972 c g
 Bezzia griseipes (Clastrier, Rioux & Descous, 1961) c g
 Bezzia grogani Spinelli & Wirth, 1990 c g
 Bezzia hainana Liu, Ge & Liu, 1996 c g
 Bezzia haroldi Meillon & Wirth, 1987 c g
 Bezzia hihifoi Clastrier & Delecolle, 1996 c g
 Bezzia hissarica Remm, 1974 c g
 Bezzia hoggarensis Clastrier, 1962 c g
 Bezzia hondurensis Spinelli & Wirth, 1990 c g
 Bezzia imbifida Dow and Turner, 1976 i c g
 Bezzia indecora Kieffer, 1912 c g
 Bezzia inflatifemora Tokunaga, 1966 c g
 Bezzia insolita Meillon & Wirth, 1983 c g
 Bezzia insularis Kieffer, 1921 c g
 Bezzia jamaicensis Spinelli, 1991 c g
 Bezzia japonica Tokunaga, 1939 i c g
 Bezzia javana (Kieffer, 1924) c g
 Bezzia jubata Spinelli & Wirth, 1990 c g
 Bezzia kazlauskasi Remm, 1966 c g
 Bezzia kempi Kieffer, 1913 c g
 Bezzia kiefferiana Goetghebuer, 1934 c g
 Bezzia kitaokai Tokunaga, 1963 c g
 Bezzia kuhbetiensis Remm, 1967 c g
 Bezzia kuhetiensis Remm, 1967 g
 Bezzia kurensis Remm, 1967 c g
 Bezzia laciniastyla Dow and Turner, 1976 i c g
 Bezzia latipalpis Clastrier, 1962 c g
 Bezzia leei Spinelli & Wirth, 1990 c g
 Bezzia lenkoi Lane, 1958 c g
 Bezzia leucogaster (Zetterstedt, 1850) c g
 Bezzia lewvanichae Wirth & Ratanaworabhan, 1981 c g
 Bezzia lineola Kieffer, 1910 c g
 Bezzia longiforceps Tokunaga, 1959 c g
 Bezzia longisaeta (Spataru, 1973) g
 Bezzia lophophora Clastrier, 1988 c g
 Bezzia lucida (Meillon, 1939) c g
 Bezzia lutea Wirth & Ratanaworabhan, 1981 c g
 Bezzia luteiventris Wirth and Grogan, 1983 i c g
 Bezzia maai Tokunaga, 1966 c g
 Bezzia maculifemorata Tokunaga & Murachi, 1959 c g
 Bezzia magnisetula Dow and Turner, 1976 i c g
 Bezzia mallochi Wirth, 1951 i c g
 Bezzia mathisi Spinelli, 1991 c g
 Bezzia mazaruni Macfie, 1940 c g
 Bezzia media (Coquillett, 1904) i c g
 Bezzia medusa Nie, Li, Li &  & Yu, 2005 c g
 Bezzia megatheca Spinelli & Wirth, 1990 c g
 Bezzia melanesiae Clastrier, 1985 c g
 Bezzia melanoflava (Clastrier, 1958) c g
 Bezzia melanoflavida (Clastrier & Wirth, 1961) c g
 Bezzia mellori Boorman & Harten, 2002 c g
 Bezzia mesotibialis Spinelli & Wirth, 1990 c g
 Bezzia mexicana Spinelli, 1991 c g
 Bezzia meyensis (Vattier & Adam, 1966) c g
 Bezzia micronyx Kieffer, 1921 c g
 Bezzia minuta Remm, 1974 c g
 Bezzia minutistyla Tokunaga, 1939 c g
 Bezzia mohave Wirth and Grogan, 1983 i c g
 Bezzia mollis Johannsen, 1931 c g
 Bezzia monacantha Kieffer, 1925 c g
 Bezzia mongolica Remm, 1972 c g
 Bezzia monotheca Sinha, Mazumdar, Das Gupta & Chaudhuri, 2003 c g
 Bezzia morvani Clastrier, 1962 c g
 Bezzia multiannulata (Strobl, 1906) c g
 Bezzia multispinosa Clastrier, 1962 c g
 Bezzia murina Kieffer, 1921 c g
 Bezzia murphyi (Clastrier & Wirth, 1961) c g
 Bezzia narynica Remm, 1973 c g
 Bezzia naseri Boorman & Harten, 2002 c g
 Bezzia nicator (Meillon, 1959) c g
 Bezzia nigerrima (Haeselbarth, 1965) c g
 Bezzia nigrialula Tokunaga, 1959 c g
 Bezzia nigriclava Kieffer, 1921 c g
 Bezzia nigripes Wirth and Grogan, 1983 i c g
 Bezzia nigrita Clastrier, 1962 c g
 Bezzia nigritibialis Spinelli, 1991 c g
 Bezzia nigritula (Zetterstedt, 1838) c g
 Bezzia nigrofasciata Tokunaga, 1959 c g
 Bezzia nigroflava Remm, 1974 c g
 Bezzia niokoloensis (Clastrier, 1958) c g
 Bezzia niphatoda Yu, 2000 c g
 Bezzia nobilis (Winnertz, 1852) i c g b
 Bezzia nodosipes (Kieffer, 1924) c g
 Bezzia numidiana Clastrier, 1962 c g
 Bezzia nyasae (Macfie, 1932) c
 Bezzia obelisca Dow and Turner, 1976 i c g
 Bezzia omanensis Boorman & Harten, 2002 c g
 Bezzia opaca  i g
 Bezzia ornata (Meigen, 1830) c g
 Bezzia ornatissima (Kieffer, 1911) c g
 Bezzia pachypyga Remm, 1974 c g
 Bezzia pallidipes Clastrier & Wirth, 1961 c g
 Bezzia palustris Clastrier, 1962 c g
 Bezzia papillistyla Sinha, Mazumdar, Das Gupta & Chaudhuri, 2003 c g
 Bezzia papuae Tokunaga, 1966 c g
 Bezzia pediaureola Tokunaga & Murachi, 1959 c g
 Bezzia perplexa Dow and Turner, 1976 i c g
 Bezzia pictipes Goetghebuer, 1948 c g
 Bezzia pilipennis Lundstrom, 1916 c g
 Bezzia pilosella Remm, 1974 c g
 Bezzia platyura (Macfie, 1947) c g
 Bezzia propriostyla Sinha, Mazumdar, Das Gupta & Chaudhuri, 2003 c g
 Bezzia prospicula Remm, 1974 c g
 Bezzia pruinosa (Coquillett, 1905) i c g
 Bezzia pseudobscura Wirth, 1951 i c g
 Bezzia pseudogibbera Spinelli & Wirth, 1990 c g
 Bezzia pseudovenstula Spinelli, 1991 c g
 Bezzia pulchripes Kieffer, 1917 c g
 Bezzia pulverea (Coquillett, 1901) i c g
 Bezzia punctipennis (Williston, 1896) i c g
 Bezzia pygmaea Goetghebuer, 1920 c g
 Bezzia raposoensis Spinelli, 1991 c g
 Bezzia rhodesiensis Haeselbarth, 1975 c g
 Bezzia rhynchostylata Remm, 1974 c g
 Bezzia riparia Clastrier, 1985 c g
 Bezzia roldani Spinelli & Wirth, 1981 c g
 Bezzia rossii Clastrier, 1962 c g
 Bezzia rubiginosa (Winnertz, 1852) c g
 Bezzia rufescens Remm, 1971 c g
 Bezzia rufifacies Goetghebuer, 1932 c g
 Bezzia rufifascies Goetghebuer, 1932 g
 Bezzia rufipes (Kieffer, 1911) c g
 Bezzia sahariensis Clastrier, 1962 c g
 Bezzia saileri Wirth, 1983 i c g
 Bezzia sajana Remm, 1972 c g
 Bezzia sandersoni Wirth and Grogan, 1983 i c g
 Bezzia schmitzorum Dippolito & Spinelli, 1995 c g
 Bezzia segermanae Haeselbarth, 1975 c g
 Bezzia separata Kieffer, 1916 c g
 Bezzia serena Johannsen, 1931 c g
 Bezzia sergenti Kieffer, 1922 c g
 Bezzia setigera Spinelli & Wirth, 1990 c g
 Bezzia setosa Remm, 1974 c g
 Bezzia setosinotum Wirth and Grogan, 1983 i c g
 Bezzia setulosa  i
 Bezzia sevanica Remm, 1974 c g
 Bezzia sexspinosa Edwards, 1928 c g
 Bezzia seychelleana (Kieffer, 1911) c
 Bezzia signata (Meigen, 1804) c g
 Bezzia sinica Hao & Yu, 2003 c g
 Bezzia sivashica Remm & Zhogolev, 1968 c g
 Bezzia snowi Spinelli, 1991 c g
 Bezzia solstitialis (Winnertz, 1852) i
 Bezzia sordida Wirth, 1952 i c g
 Bezzia spathula Wirth and Grogan, 1983 i c g
 Bezzia spicata Dow and Turner, 1976 i c g
 Bezzia spinosella Clastrier, 1983 c g
 Bezzia spinositibialis Tokunaga & Murachi, 1959 c g
 Bezzia strigula Clastrier, 1962 c g
 Bezzia suavis Johannsen, 1931 c g
 Bezzia subfusca Macfie, 1939 c g
 Bezzia sulfureicruris Tokunaga & Murachi, 1959 c g
 Bezzia tadsignata Remm, 1974 c g
 Bezzia taeniata (Haliday, 1856) c g
 Bezzia tasmaniensis Lee, 1948 c g
 Bezzia tenuiforceps Clastrier, 1962 c g
 Bezzia ternidenta Yu, 2000 c g
 Bezzia texensis Wirth and Grogan, 1983 i c g
 Bezzia tirawati Wirth & Ratanaworabhan, 1981 c g
 Bezzia transfuga (Staeger, 1839) c g
 Bezzia transitiva Remm, 1974 c g
 Bezzia trispinosa Kieffer, 1911 c g
 Bezzia troglophila (Vattier & Adam, 1966) c g
 Bezzia tshernovskii Remm, 1993 c g
 Bezzia turbipes Sinha, Mazumdar, Das Gupta & Chaudhuri, 2003 c g
 Bezzia turkmenica Glukhova, 1979 c g
 Bezzia turrita Meillon & Wirth, 1983 c g
 Bezzia twinni Wirth, 1983 i c g
 Bezzia umlalazia Meillon, 1940 c g
 Bezzia uncistyla Dow and Turner, 1976 i c g
 Bezzia unispina Dow and Turner, 1976 i c g
 Bezzia ussurica Glukhova, 1979 c g
 Bezzia varia Haeselbarth, 1975 c g
 Bezzia varicolor (Coquillett, 1902) i c g b
 Bezzia ventanensis Spinelli g
 Bezzia venustula Spinelli, 1991 c g
 Bezzia vilbastei Remm, 1971 c g
 Bezzia vitilevuensis Wirth & Giles, 1990 c g
 Bezzia vittata Tokunaga, 1966 c g
 Bezzia winnertziana Kieffer, 1919 c g
 Bezzia wirthi Haeselbarth, 1965 c g
 Bezzia woodruffi Spinelli, 1991 c g
 Bezzia xanthocephala Goetghebuer, 1911 c g
 Bezzia xanthogaster Kieffer, 1919 c
 Bezzia yasumatsui Wirth & Ratanaworabhan, 1981 c g
 Bezzia zajantshkauskasi Remm, 1966 c g
 Bezzia zonatipes Tokunaga, 1966 c g

Data sources: i = ITIS, c = Catalogue of Life, g = GBIF, b = Bugguide.net

References

Bezzia
Bezzia
Articles created by Qbugbot